Goran Vukliš (born 24 September 1987) is a Bosnian footballer who plays as a goalkeeper.

Club career
In February 2016, he was presented as a new arrival at Borac Banja Luka.
Vukliš joined  Sloboda Tuzla in summer 2018, but left them in summer 2019 for Vojvodina. He spent the 2019-20 season on loan at Kabel.

References

External links
 
 
 

1987 births
Living people
Sportspeople from Banja Luka
Association football goalkeepers
Bosnia and Herzegovina footballers
FK Radnički Nova Pazova players
FK Laktaši players
FK Leotar players
FK BSK Banja Luka players
FK Rudar Pljevlja players
OFK Grbalj players
OFK Petrovac players
FK Borac Banja Luka players
OFK Beograd players
FK Novi Pazar players
FK Sloboda Tuzla players
FK Kabel players
FK Vojvodina players
First League of the Republika Srpska players
Montenegrin First League players
Premier League of Bosnia and Herzegovina players
Serbian SuperLiga players
Serbian First League players
Bosnia and Herzegovina expatriate footballers
Expatriate footballers in Montenegro
Bosnia and Herzegovina expatriate sportspeople in Montenegro
Expatriate footballers in Serbia
Bosnia and Herzegovina expatriate sportspeople in Serbia